Ziddi may refer to:
Ziddi (1948 film), a Hindi film
Ziddi (1964 film), a film by Pramod Chakravorty
Ziddi (1973 film), a Pakistani film in Punjabi language
Ziddi (1997 film), an Indian action film starring Sunny Deol and Raveena Tandon
Ziddi (2013 film), an Indian Kannada language action film
Ziddi, Tajikistan, a town and jamoat in Tajikistan